Moviestorm is a real-time 3D animation app published by Moviestorm Ltd. The software is available to and used by people of all age groups and appeals to those with a diverse range of backgrounds and interests, from amateur and professional film makers, through to businesses and education, as well as people just looking to simply tell stories or create messages to share using video. Moviestorm enables the user to create animated movies, using machinima technology. It takes the user from initial concept to finished, distributed movies. Sets and characters can be created and customised, and scenes can be filmed using multiple cameras.

Moviestorm is being used predominantly in education by students of film and media studies as a means to develop their skills and expand their portfolio, as well as a collaborative cross-curricular creative tool in education sectors from elementary to high school.

The software's website features a Web 2.0 social media service, which includes a video hosting service, and an online community where movie-makers can talk about their movies, find collaborators, and organise online events. Moviestorm also makes use of Twitter, YouTube and Facebook to release the latest news on the software and to interact with both current and potential users and website ranked it as best software for beginners

History
Founded as a startup in Cambridge by Machinima experts Matt Kelland and Dave Lloyd, Moviestorm got three investment rounds of £400k in 2005, £900k in 2007 and $3M in 2008.
Moviestorm has been generally available since August 2008 and over 160,000 people have now registered to use it.

The interface has undergone fairly radical change since its first incarnation. Many User Interface improvements were implemented with the release of version 1.3 in June 2010 and version 1.4, released in August 2010, contained some long-awaited upgrades especially in the Dressing room which allows much more control over facial morphing of avatars. This release also features a completely new lighting system which more closely resembles the 3-light systems used in real live action filming. Version 1.5 was released on 8 December, and featured many upgrades to the program, including an auto save feature, a new video export format, and a "terrain editor", where users can now edit the default green mountains surrounding the set.

More recently, Moviestorm have released an iPad app that provides users with a simplified video creation solution, an approach to the genre suited to cross-curricular teaching and learning, converting Powerpoints into slideshows that present themselves, and fun video messaging.

Moviestorm Ltd interacts with customers in its active online forums.

Business model
Users new to the program can try it for 14 days for free by registering at the website. Thereafter users can purchase the application outright with different content bundling options. Moviestorm Points can also be bought to acquire additional content from the online marketplace, or gifted to other users in return for advice or assistance or in payment for a user-created modification.  Subscribers have access to the Modders Workshop a tool which allows them to create their own 'props' and a wizard allows the direct import of models from Google SketchUp version 6. As of 2011, users can create their own custom "gestures" with the release of the Moviestorm skeletons.

Subscribers can also increase their points at any time by buying more points from the online marketplace. A subscription can be discontinued at any time, and resumed later with no penalty.

Examples of use

Children's animation
Blockhouse TV, based in Norwich, UK, utilised Moviestorm in their animated series for children, Jack and Holly. The first season, Jack and Holly's Christmas Countdown, was released in 2010. The second season, Jack and Holly's Cosmic Stories, was released in 2011.

Film and media teaching
Moviestorm has been used in film schools and media courses in many countries. Wan Smolbag Theatre in Vanuatu was one of the first to adopt it in 2008, under tutor John Herd. Students trained on Moviestorm have gone on to successful careers with the island's TV network. It is in use at many different educational sectors, from elementary schools to sixth form colleges and universities.

In addition to film teaching, Moviestorm has been used in educational contexts for a variety of other media, including computer games and music.

Other education
Some teachers have found Moviestorm useful as a cross-curricular tool for collaborative creative expression. Paul Carr at Sakuragaoka Junior and Senior High School, Japan uses it to help teach English to Japanese students. One of his techniques is to create silent videos for which the students then have to compose dialog. Other teachers have found it useful for helping autistic students to make presentations, since they can prepare their presentation as a video instead of having to stand up in front of a class.

Business
Commercial companies including Oracle Corporation and Fujitsu have used Moviestorm to create low-cost training videos. Other companies have used it to create cheap advertising content that can be produced in-house. Think Industries in Eastern England is an advertising and marketing company that uses Moviestorm to pitch its ideas to prospective clients. "Pitching is key, and you have to stand out," said owner Philip Morley in an interview in 2011. "Video is just so much more powerful than text. People will watch even if they don’t read documents. It’s now cost-effective to create custom videos for every pitch. I can re-use a lot of the material I already have, and just tweak it as I need. I can more or less change things in real time if necessary."

Music video
Moviestorm has been used as a low-cost alternative for bands wanting to create animated videos. The first commercial band to do so was Vice Romania in November 2008. Their video to This Is It
was created by Lucinda McNary of Two Moon Graphics in Kansas. Moviestorm footage was combined with a character filmed in DAZ3D and composited using greenscreen.

In 2009, Priscilla Angelique started using Moviestorm to create videos for several tracks on her London-based label A Priscilla Thing. "Music videos are a very expensive and time consuming process but Moviestorm allows me to achieve shots and effects that even with a modest budget would still be very out of reach," she said in an interview in late 2010.

In November 2011, Chicago chiptune band I Fight Dragons ran a contest challenging Moviestorm users to make the official video for their single, Working. (Moviestorm user and then-film student Kera "162" Hildebrandt would win the contest with her entry.)

Previsualization and film pitching
Moviestorm's rapid production has led to it being used by live action filmmakers and scriptwriters for pre-production. Since the footage used in previsualization is not intended to be included in the final product, the quality of the graphics is not a critical consideration. Independent filmmaker D.L. Watson in Oregon used it to create a complete animated storyboard on his short film The Letter (2009). London-based scriptwriter Dean P. Wells uses it to test out movie ideas and then creates trailers based on his scripts.

See also
iClone
Muvizu
Xtranormal
Shark 3D

References

External links
 Computeractive article
 Moviestorm Ltd's page about the software
 Business Weekly article
 Review in Microfilmmaker Magazine
 Article on Softpedia website
 Fallopian On-Line Magazine article on Moviestorm's use by Wan Smolbag Theatre's Youth Centre in Vanuatu
 Chipchick.com Moviestorm Lets You Make 3D Animated Movies on your Home Computer

Software companies established in 2008
2008 software
3D animation software
Machinima